Paul Fridolin Kehr (28 December 1860, Waltershausen – 9 November 1944, Wässerndorf) was a German historian and archivist.

In 1893 he was appointed professor of history and auxiliary sciences at the University of Marburg, and two years later, procured the same title at the University of Göttingen (from 1895).

In 1903 he was named director of the Prussian Historical Institute in Rome, and in 1915 became general director of the Prussian State Archives. During the same year, he became chairman of the central directorate of "Monumenta Germaniae Historica", as well as director of the Kaiser Wilhelm Institute for German History.  In 1940, he was awarded the Eagle Shield of the German Reich with the distinction "The outstanding researcher of medieval history". Kehr died in Wässerndorf and was buried in the private cemetery of those of Pölnitz near Hundshaupten Castle.

Publications 
Kehr is best known for documentary research on the Papacy and of German imperial history. He was editor or co-editor of the following:
 Päpstlichen Urkunden und Regesten aus den Jahren 1358–78 (two volumes 1886–1889) – Papal documents and summaries from the years 1358–78.
 Die Urkunden Otto III (1889) – The documents of Otto III.
 Regesta Pontificum Romanorum ("Italia pontifica" seven volumes, Berlin 1906 to 1925)-- documents issued by the papacy relevant to Italian churches
 Germania sacra (Volume 1, Berlin 1929).

References

External links
 

1860 births
1944 deaths
People from Waltershausen
People from Saxe-Coburg and Gotha
German archivists
20th-century German historians
German male non-fiction writers
Academic staff of the University of Marburg
Academic staff of the University of Göttingen
Recipients of the Pour le Mérite (civil class)
Corresponding Fellows of the British Academy
21st-century German historians
Max Planck Institute directors